Porcelain Film Ltd is a British independent production company formed in 2004 by film director and screenwriter Nicholas Winter.

In 2006  Gina Lyons joined as Producer, together they have worked on a variety of television packages for the BAFTA award-winning company So Television, they also produce music videos, short films and feature films.

Porcelain Film released their first feature-length film Breathe in 2009. Breathe was nominated for Best Feature Film at the London Independent Film Festival 2010. Nicholas Winter won the award for Best Director.

A second feature About a Girl is in post production and due for release late 2013.

References

External links 
 

Film production companies of the United Kingdom